The 1999–2000 Irish Cup was the 120th edition of Northern Ireland's premier football knock-out cup competition. It concluded on 6 May 2000 with the final.

Portadown were the defending champions, winning their 2nd Irish Cup last season after Cliftonville were disqualified from the 1999 final. This season Portadown reached the final again, but were defeated 1–0 by Glentoran, who won the cup for the 18th time.

Fifth round

|}

Replay

|}

Sixth round

|}

Replays

|}

Quarter-finals

|}

Replay

|}

Semi-finals

|}

Replay

|}

Final

References

1999–2000
1999–2000 domestic association football cups
Cup